John Bernard Rogers Bakker (born December 30, 1963) is a Spanish-American former professional basketball player. Rogers played college basketball at Stanford University and at the University of California, Irvine. Listed at a height of 6'10" and 225 lbs., he played at the power forward position. 

During his pro club career, Rogers won the EuroLeague championship twice, in 2000 and 2002. In 2018, he was named to the 101 Greats of European Basketball list.

College career
Rogers played college basketball at Stanford University, with the Stanford Cardinal, from 1981 to 1983. After Stanford, he played college basketball at UC Irvine, with the UC Irvine Anteaters, from 1984 to 1986.

Professional career

NBA
Rogers was selected with the 10th pick (34th overall) of the second round, in the 1986 NBA Draft, by the Sacramento Kings. He played in the NBA for the Kings (1986–87), and the Cleveland Cavaliers (1987–88). He played in a total of 69 NBA games, in which he averaged 3.6 points and 1.5 rebounds per game, in 9.2 minutes per game of playing time.

Europe
Rogers also played professionally in Italy, with Philips Milano (Serie A1, 1991–92, which was coached by Mike D'Antoni), Cagiva Varese (Serie A2, 1992–93), and Telemarket Forlì (Serie A2, 1993–94).

He also played with both of the Greek giants, Olympiacos and Panathinaikos. With Panathinaikos, he won 2 EuroLeague championships (2000, 2002), and 2 Greek League championships (2000, 2001).

National team career
During his time in Spain, Rogers acquired Spanish citizenship, and he subsequently played for the senior men's Spanish national team at the 2000 Summer Olympics.

Post-playing career
After he retired from playing professional basketball, Rogers began a career in TV broadcasting, working for the EuroLeague, and EuroLeague TV.

References

External links
NBA stats @ basketballreference.com

1963 births
Living people
American expatriate basketball people in Greece
American expatriate basketball people in Italy
American expatriate basketball people in Spain
American men's basketball players
Basketball players at the 2000 Summer Olympics
Basketball players from California
CB Murcia players
Cleveland Cavaliers players
Greek Basket League players
Liga ACB players
Olimpia Milano players
Olympiacos B.C. players
Olympic basketball players of Spain
Panathinaikos B.C. players
Parade High School All-Americans (boys' basketball)
People from Westminster, California
Power forwards (basketball)
Real Madrid Baloncesto players
Sacramento Kings draft picks
Sacramento Kings players
Spanish men's basketball players
Sportspeople from Fullerton, California
Stanford Cardinal men's basketball players
UC Irvine Anteaters men's basketball players
Valencia Basket players